Santo Loku Pio Doggale was born 28 December 1969 in Katiré, in the diocese of Torit.  He is the auxiliary bishop of Juba, south Sudan.

Biography 

Santo Loku Pio attended his primary school in Kworijic before joining  Minor Seminary of Saint Mary in Juba and then attended St Mary's Secondary School, receiving the Sudan Certificate. He was Ordained Priest  of Juba on 7 Jan 2001 and served for 17 years and was consecrated as bishop on 20 Feb 2011. He was appointed as auxiliary bishop of Juba and titular bishop of Equizetum on 27 Nov 2010.

References

External links

1969 births
Living people
21st-century Roman Catholic bishops in South Sudan
Auxiliary bishops
21st-century Roman Catholic titular bishops
South Sudanese Roman Catholic bishops
Roman Catholic bishops of Juba